Tracy Sachtjen (Zeman, born February 20, 1969) is an American curler from Lodi, Wisconsin. She is a former world champion and Olympian.

Curling career
Sachtjen started curling in 1982. By 1987 she had made her first appearance at the U.S. Junior National Championships. Her first appearance at the United States National Championships came in 1993 and in 1997 she won her first gold medal at the event, with her team skipped by Patti Lank. At her first world championships in 1997 in Berne, Switzerland, her team placed sixth. She has competed at eight U.S. National Championships, five World Championships, and two World Junior Championships. She has one gold and one silver medal from World Championship competition.

In February 2009, Sachtjen and her team, skipped by Debbie McCormick won the 2010 US Olympic Trials, earning the right to compete for the United States at the 2010 Vancouver Olympic Games. (This event also served as the qualifier for the 2009 World Championships.)

Teams

References

External links
 

1969 births
Living people
People from Sauk County, Wisconsin
American female curlers
Olympic curlers of the United States
Curlers at the 2010 Winter Olympics
World curling champions
American curling champions
Continental Cup of Curling participants
Sportspeople from Wisconsin
People from Lodi, Wisconsin
21st-century American women